Pavel Kolmakov (born 14 August 1996) is a Kazakhstani freestyle skier, specializing in moguls.

Kolmakov competed at the 2014 Winter Olympics for Kazakhstan. He placed 11th in the first qualifying round in the moguls, not advancing. He then finished 4th in the second qualifying round, moving on to the final. In the first run of the final, he placed 11th, advancing to the second run, where he finished 10th, not advancing to the final medal run.

As of April 2014, his best showing at the World Championships is 37th, in the 2013 moguls.

Kolmakov made his World Cup debut in December 2012. As of April 2014, his best World Cup finish is 10th, in a moguls event at Deer Valley in 2013–14. His best World Cup overall finish in moguls is 39th, in 2013–14.

References

External links

1996 births
Living people
Olympic freestyle skiers of Kazakhstan
Freestyle skiers at the 2014 Winter Olympics
Freestyle skiers at the 2018 Winter Olympics
Freestyle skiers at the 2022 Winter Olympics
Sportspeople from Oskemen
Kazakhstani male freestyle skiers
Universiade medalists in freestyle skiing
Freestyle skiers at the 2017 Asian Winter Games
Universiade gold medalists for Kazakhstan
Universiade silver medalists for Kazakhstan
Universiade bronze medalists for Kazakhstan
Competitors at the 2015 Winter Universiade
Competitors at the 2017 Winter Universiade
Competitors at the 2019 Winter Universiade
21st-century Kazakhstani people